The 2022 Nepal Super League will be the second season of the Nepal Super League, the top flight franchise based club football league of Nepal. A total of ten franchises will participate in the tournament to be played at the Dasharath Rangasala from 8 April to 21 May 2022. Kathmandu Rayzrs won the inaugural season after beating Dhangadhi FC in the final on 15 May 2021. In addition to the seven founding members, three new franchises were added. Jhapa FC will represent Jhapa, Province No. 1, Sporting Ilam De Mechi FC the Ilam, Province No. 1 and Birgunj United FC the Birgunj, Province No. 2.

Teams

References 

2022
2021–22 in Nepalese football
2022 in Asian association football leagues